Nimmons can refer to:
 George Nimmons, architect
 Phil Nimmons, jazz musician
 Steve Nimmons, technologist
 Nimmons, Arkansas